Granite Peak is a mountain located in the Trinity Alps of California in the Trinity Alps Wilderness.
The peak receives copious amounts of snow during the winter.

References

External links
 

Mountains of Trinity County, California
Klamath Mountains
Mountains of Northern California